Rima Ariadaeus is a linear rille on the Moon at . It is named after the crater Ariadaeus, which marks its eastern end. It is over 300 km long and is categorized as a straight rille because of its linear nature.

Formation 
Some scientists think that the linear rilles might have formed after large impact events, while others believe that the rilles were formed as a surface manifestation of deep-seated dike systems when the Moon was still volcanically active. Rima Ariadaeus is thought to have been formed when a section of the Moon's crust sank down between two parallel fault lines (making it a graben or fault trough). Rima Ariadaeus shows no trace of associated volcanism and is thus considered to be an end member of the sequence where only pure faulting is involved i.e. a linear rille.

Age 
The ridges crossing the rille trough of Rima Ariadaeus and the surrounding plains units have been offset by the trough, proving that the ridges are older than the faults. Some craters are cut off by the faults and are, therefore, older. Other craters lie on the wall of the trough and are younger than the faulting. The faulting must be relatively young because so few craters appear to be younger than the faults, and because the edges of the trough appear to be crisp and little affected by slumping and other mass wasting.

NASA photograph 
Apollo mission photographs of the Rima Ariadaeus revealed a 300 km-long (about one eighteenth of the moon's diameter) rift line on the surface of the moon. On being asked in 2010 about Internet suggestions that this was proof of the Islamic story of the splitting of the moon, NASA scientist Brad Bailey said, "My recommendation is to not believe everything you read on the internet. Peer-reviewed papers are the only scientifically valid sources of information out there. No current scientific evidence reports that the Moon was split into two (or more) parts and then reassembled at any point in the past."

References

External links